
This is a list of National Historic Landmarks in Vermont.  There are 18 National Historic Landmarks in Vermont.

This is intended to be a complete list of properties and districts that are,  National Historic Landmarks in Vermont.  The locations of National Register properties and districts (at least for all showing latitude and longitude coordinates below) may be seen in an online map by clicking on "Map of all coordinates".

|}

Former landmark

See also

National Register of Historic Places listings in Vermont
List of National Historic Landmarks by state

References 

Vermont

 
National historic landmarks
National Historic Landmarks